The 1974 United States Senate election in Alaska took place on November 5, 1974. Incumbent Democratic U.S. Senator Mike Gravel was re-elected to a second term in office, defeating Republican State Senator Clyde "C.R." Lewis. As of 2022, it is the last time the Democrats or a person not named Murkowski have won the Class 3 Senate seat in Alaska.

Primary election

Democratic
 Mike Gravel, incumbent U.S. Senator
 Dick Greuel, former Speaker of the Alaska House of Representatives
 Gene Guess, former Speaker of the Alaska House of Representatives and candidate for Senate in 1972
 Donald W. Hobbs

Results

Republican
 Bob Aaron
 Merle Gnagy
 Clyde "C.R." Lewis, State Senator from Anchorage
 Terry Miller, State Senator from North Pole
 Red Stevens

Results

General election

See also
 1974 United States Senate elections

References

1974
Alaska
United States Senate
Mike Gravel